Károly Makk (December 22, 1925 – August 30, 2017) was a Hungarian film director and screenwriter. Five of his films were nominated for the Palme d'Or at the Cannes Film Festival; however, he won lesser awards at Cannes and elsewhere. He was born in Berettyóújfalu, Hungary.

In 1973 he was a member of the jury at the 8th Moscow International Film Festival. In 1980, he was a member of the jury at the 30th Berlin International Film Festival. His film A Long Weekend in Pest and Buda (2003) was entered into the 25th Moscow International Film Festival. From September 27, 2011, he was the president of the Széchenyi Academy of Literature and Arts.

Select filmography
 Liliomfi (1954)
 Ward No. 9 (1955)
 The House Under the Rocks (1959)
 Lost Paradise (1962)
 Love (1971) - Won the Jury Prize at the Cannes Film Festival in 1971
 Cats' Play (1972) - Nominated for Academy Award for Best Foreign Language Film in 1974
 A Very Moral Night (1977)
  (1982)
 Another Way (1982) - Won the award for Best Actress at the 1982 Cannes Film Festival
 Lily in Love (1984)
 The Last Manuscript (1987)
 Hungarian Requiem (1991)
 The Gambler (1997) - about the writing of Fyodor Dostoyevsky's novella by the same name
 A Long Weekend in Pest and Buda (2003)
 The Way You Are (2010)

References

External links
 

1925 births
2017 deaths
Hungarian film directors
People from Berettyóújfalu
Members of the Széchenyi Academy of Literature and Arts